= Vanamaladinne =

Coordinates: 13°19′N 78°31′E

Vanamaladinne is a village in Chittoor district in Andhra Pradesh, India. It falls under Punganur Mandal.

Vanamaladinne is famous for Tomato field and Potato fields. Like many other villages it is also famous for local politics.

Most of the farmers in the village at least own a two wheeler.
